Howard David Fineman (November 17, 1948) is an American journalist and television commentator. In a career that spanned nearly five decades, Fineman has covered nine presidential campaigns as a reporter, writer, and analyst. For 30 years, he drove Newsweek magazine's political coverage. At the height of the publication's influence, Fineman was its chief political correspondent, senior editor and deputy Washington bureau chief. His "Living Politics" column was posted weekly on Newsweek.com. Following Newsweek,he was named global editorial director of the AOL Huffington Post Media Group. 

Fineman has also been an NBC News analyst, contributing reports to the network and its cable affiliate MSNBC. He appeared regularly on Hardball with Chris Matthews, The Last Word with Lawrence O'Donnell, and The Rachel Maddow Show. The author of scores of Newsweek cover stories, Fineman's work has appeared in The New York Times, The Washington Post, The New Republic and RealClearPolitics, where was a contributing correspondent   during the 2020 election cycle.   Between 2017 and 2019, Fineman was a lecturer at the University of Pennsylvania Annenberg School of Communications, teaching a seminar on “New Media Journalism and Politics in the Trump Era.”  

Fineman is the author of The Thirteen American Arguments: Enduring Debates That Define and Inspire Our Country, which takes the position that we are a nation built on healthy disagreements and arguments. Washingtonian magazine described the book as offering a “unique vantage point from which to see that the debates that shape American politics are timeless and profound."

Early life and education
Fineman was raised in a Jewish family in the Squirrel Hill neighborhood of Pittsburgh, the son of Jean (née Lederman) and Charles Fineman, both teachers. Fineman attended Colfax Elementary and Taylor Allderdice High School, graduating in 1966. The family belonged to the Tree of Life – Or L'Simcha Congregation, where Fineman celebrated his bar mitzvah. In 2018, he wrote an opinion piece for the New York Times about how the horrific attack on the temple by an antisemite, killing eleven people, "is part of a larger pattern of mayhem and hatred in America and around the world." Fineman holds a B.A. from Colgate University, where he was Phi Beta Kappa and a member of Beta Theta Pi, an M.S. in journalism from the Columbia University Graduate School of Journalism and a J.D. from the University of Louisville School of Law. His legal education also included a year at the Georgetown University Law Center. He was also a recipient of both the Thomas J. Watson Fellowship and the Pulitzer Traveling Fellowship for study in Europe, Russia and the Middle East. Fineman used the grant to travel to Ukraine and explore his family's Jewish roots.  In March 2022, Fineman wrote about the experience after Russia invaded Ukraine.

Career
He began his journalism career at The Louisville Courier-Journal, covering the environment, the coal industry and state politics before joining the newspaper's Washington bureau in 1978.  He moved to Newsweek in 1980, was named Chief Political Correspondent in 1984, Deputy Washington Bureau Chief in 1993 and Senior Editor in 1995. He has become a regular guest on Tony Kornheiser's podcast (The Tony Kornheiser Show) offering political insight to Tony as well as Pittsburgh sports updates. Tony refers to him as "The Intergalactic Editor of the Huffington Post".

In a discussion of pack journalism during the 1988 presidential campaign, author/journalist Richard Ben Cramer identifies a Fineman profile piece in Newsweek as the tipping point at which unattributed rumors and whispered speculation about the private life of Democratic candidate Gary Hart were made public and effectively legitimated. Fineman, Cramer writes, posed to a 1984 Hart campaign aide a series of leading, uncorroborated assertions about Hart's fidelity, finally prompting the aide to say, "Yuh, well, you know ... he'll always be in jeopardy ... if he can't keep his pants on." The aide later complained that the comment was off the record and, in any event, based solely on speculation, but Fineman bootstrapped the quote into publication with the unattributed lead-in "many political observers expect the rumors to emerge as a campaign issue." The subsequent, unprecedented media focus on the personal life of Hart, who to that point was the clear frontrunner for the Democratic nomination, resulted in Hart's decision to drop his candidacy.

Accomplishments and awards
Fineman covered the contentious 2000 presidential campaign, and subsequently covered the presidency of  George W. Bush. A Newsweek cover story in November 2001 featured the president's first extensive post-9/11 interview. Fineman's other awards include a "Page One" from the Headliners Club of New York, a "Silver Gavel" from the American Bar Association, and a "Deadline Club" from the Society of Professional Journalists.

Fineman has written on the rise of the "religious right", the power of talk radio, race and politics, and the Pledge of Allegiance controversy. He has interviewed business leaders such as Bill Gates, Steve Case, and Steve Ballmer. He interviewed GOP operative Lee Atwater, in the documentary Boogie Man: The Lee Atwater Story.

Fineman reports for NBC, and has appeared on most major public affairs shows. He was a panelist on PBS's Washington Week in Review from 1983 to 1995, and on CNN's Capital Gang from 1995 to 1998.

Fineman holds honorary degrees from Colgate University, the University of Louisville Washington and Jefferson College, and Gettysburg College

References

Notes

Howard Fineman discussing Lee Atwater in the film Boogie Man: The Lee Atwater Story

External links

 
 

1948 births
Jewish American journalists
American magazine staff writers
Colgate University alumni
Columbia University Graduate School of Journalism alumni
Georgetown University Law Center alumni
Journalists from Pennsylvania
Living people
Newsweek people
University of Louisville School of Law alumni
Writers from Pittsburgh
HuffPost writers and columnists
Courier Journal people
Taylor Allderdice High School alumni